Paul Jozef de Cock (21 June 1724, Bruges - 29 December 1801, Bruges) was a Flemish architect and painter.

Biography 
He was born to Philippe de Cock and Thérèse Cambier. His younger brother, also became a well-known painter.

In 1740, he was awarded a second prize for drawing and, in 1741, first prize for all subjects combined. He received a prize for architectural drawing in 1743.

From 1748 to 1749, he lived in Paris and Valenciennes, where he was a copyist for a merchant. After returning to Bruges, he was commissioned to paint a large landscape in the Town Hall at Kortrijk, modeled after the work of the Dutch master, Philips Wouwerman. Later, he created some large murals and bas-reliefs, many featuring horses and battlefields. He would eventually produce more than 1200 works, but he always earned his living primarily as an architect and builder.

Around 1750 he became an architectural instructor at the Brugse Academie and, from 1775 until his death, he served as its Director; succeeding Jan Garemijn, with whom he occasionally lived.

Most of his works are in the collection of the Groeningemuseum.

References

Sources 
 Albert Schouteet, Beknopte geschiedenis van de Vrije Academie voor Schone Kunsten en van de Stedelijke Academie voor Schone Kunsten te Brugge, Brugge, 1967.
 Lexicon van West-Vlaamse kunstenaars, Brugge, 1993.
 Robert De Laere, "Paul Jozef De Cock, kunstschilder en Bouwmeester", in: Heemkundige Bijdragen voor Brugge en Ommeland, 2010, n° 5.

External links

1724 births
1801 deaths
18th-century Flemish painters
Architects from Bruges
Artists from Bruges
Architects of the Austrian Netherlands